Vernonia andapensis is a species of perennial plant in the family Asteraceae. It is endemic to Madagascar.

References 

andapensis
Endemic flora of Madagascar